Belmopan Baptist High School (BBHS) is a Christian secondary school in Belmopan, Belize which receives some funding from the Belizean government.

It was established, with three full-time teachers, one part-time teacher, and seven students, in the Scarborough Centre campus on September 28, 1998. Its first graduation was in June 2002. This campus includes a two-story school building.  it had about 300 students.

References

External links
 

Schools in Belize
Baptist schools
1998 establishments in Belize
Educational institutions established in 1998